The Granary, also known as Wait and James' Granary, is a building on Welsh Back in the English city of Bristol. It was designed by Archibald Ponton and William Venn Gough in red Cattybrook brick, with black and white brick and limestone dressings. It is probably the best preserved example of the Bristol Byzantine style and is designated by English Heritage as a grade II* listed building.

The building was built in 1869 as a granary for Wait, James and Co. It was used to dry large quantities of grain, so it had to be strong, stable and warm, with good ventilation. Between 1968 and 1988, it housed a nightclub, also known as The Granary. In 2002, the building was converted into apartments, after the owners, Bristol City Council, had invited competitive bids from developers for its renovation and conversion. Barton Willmore produced the designs which supported the winning bid.

Granary nightclub
The Granary housed a nightclub, also known as The Granary, from 1968 to 1988. Initially opened as a jazz club by Ted Cowell under the guidance of Acker Bilk in 1968, it started hosting regular rock nights in 1969, when a collective called Plastic Dog, whose club night had become too busy for the Dugout club on Park Row, took over the poorly attended Monday nights. By early 1970 they had removed 'Old' from the title of the venue, which completed its transition to an all-rock club by 1978. Many well-known rock acts played there, including Yes, Genesis, Status Quo, Motörhead and Iron Maiden.

See also
 Grade II* listed buildings in Bristol

References

Bibliography
 

Bristol Harbourside
Towers in Bristol
Industrial buildings completed in 1869
Office buildings completed in 1869
1869 establishments in England
Grade II* listed buildings in Bristol
Grade II* listed industrial buildings
Grade II* listed office buildings
Brick buildings and structures
Byzantine Revival architecture in the United Kingdom